Gabriel Hernández Paz (born 2 January 1975) is a Spanish water polo coach of Pro Recco and former water polo player. He was a member of the Spain men's national water polo team, playing as a driver. He was a part of the  team at the 2000 Summer Olympics and 2004 Summer Olympics. On club level he played for CN Atlètic-Barceloneta in Spain.

After his career, in 2011 he became a water polo coach, and was the coach of Spain's national team for the 2016 Summer Olympics.

See also
 List of world champions in men's water polo
 List of World Aquatics Championships medalists in water polo

References

External links
 

1975 births
Living people
Water polo players from Barcelona
Spanish male water polo players
Water polo players at the 2000 Summer Olympics
Water polo players at the 2004 Summer Olympics
Olympic water polo players of Spain
Spanish water polo coaches
Spain men's national water polo team coaches
Water polo coaches at the 2016 Summer Olympics